Love Me Now? (stylized as LoVE me NOw) is the third studio album by Canadian rapper Tory Lanez. It was released on October 26, 2018, through Mad Love Records and Interscope Records. This is the follow-up release to his second album Memories Don't Die which was released seven months prior.
 The production on the album was handled by multiple producers including Foreign Teck, OZ, Smash David, Cassius Jay, CashMoneyAP and NES among others. The album also features guest appearances by Chris Brown, 2 Chainz, Meek Mill, Rich the Kid, Lil Baby, A Boogie wit da Hoodie, Trippie Redd, Nav, Gunna and Bryson Tiller among others.

Love Me Now? was supported by three singles: "Talk To Me", "Keep in Touch" and "Ferris Wheel". The album received generally mixed reviews from music critics and was a commercial success. The album debuted at number four on the US Billboard 200, earning 54,000 album-equivalent units in its first week.

Background
Tory Lanez announced that he is working on two new albums, "Love Me Now" and "El Agua", set to be released on summer. He also announced on September 3 that XXXTentacion will be featured on his new album "Love Me Now". Lanez later unveiled on October 17, the release date of his new album, the cover album, the tracklist and featured artists, also revealing that XXXTentacion will not appear in the album. He also explained the reason why XXXTentacion does not appear in the album:

The album was released on October 26, 2018.

Singles
Love Me Now? was supported by three singles. The first single, "Talk to Me" with Rich the Kid was released on June 21, 2018. Tory premiered the single on Zane Lowe's Beats 1 radio show to promote the "Love Me Now?" album. The music video was released on July 17, 2018. The single debuted at number 76 on the US Billboard Hot 100 chart on the week of November 10, 2018. The single eventually peaked at number 43 on the chart dated January 12, 2019. The second single, "Keep in Touch" featuring Bryson Tiller was released on August 17, 2018. The third single, "Ferris Wheel" featuring Trippie Redd was released on January 15, 2019. The music video was also released the same day. The single missed the Hot 100 but managed to peak at number five on the US Bubbling Under the Hot 100 chart.

Promotional singles
The first promotional single, "Numbers Out The Gym" was released on July 27, 2018. The music video was also released the same day. The second promotional single, "B.A.B.Y. featuring Moneybagg Yo was released on August 10, 2018. The music video was also released the same day. The third promotional single, "Kendall Jenner Music" later retitled as "KJM" was released on August 25, 2018. The music video was released online the following day. The fourth promotional single, "Drip Drip Drip" featuring Meek Mill was released on October 19, 2018. The single peaked at number six on the US Bubbling Under the Hot 100 chart. The song also peaked at number 56 on the Canadian Hot 100 and number 82 on the UK Singles Chart respectively. The final promotional single, "Miami" featuring Gunna was released October 24, 2018. The single peaked at number 14 on the US Bubbling Under the Hot 100 chart. The song also peaked at number 89 on the Canadian Hot 100.

Critical reception

Love Me Now? received mixed reviews from critics. In a review for Pitchfork, Alphonse Pierre wrote, "There isn't anything new LoVE me NOw will teach you about Tory Lanez. He still craves respect and wants to be recognized by his peers and fans alike as the hip-hop and R&B savant that he thinks he is."

At the Juno Awards of 2019, the album won the Juno Award for Rap Recording of the Year.

Commercial performance
Love Me Now? debuted at number four on the US Billboard 200, earning 54,000 album-equivalent units (including 5,000 copies as pure album sales) in its first week. This became Tory Lanez's third US top-ten debut on the chart. The album also accumulated a total of 62.5 million on-demand audio streams from the its songs that week. In its second week, the album dropped to number 17 on the chart, earning an additional 28,000 units.

Track listing
Credits were adapted from iTunes and Tidal.

Notes
  signifies an additional producer
  signifies an uncredited co-producer
 "Why Don't You Love Me?" is stylized as "Why DON’T You LOVE me?"
 "She Told Me" is stylized as "SHE tOLd Me"
 "Duck My Ex" is stylized as "DucK my Ex"
 "Drip Drip Drip" is stylized as "DrIP DrIp Drip"
 "Talk to Me" is stylized as "TAlk tO Me"
 "Flexible" is stylized as "FlEXiBle"
 "If It Ain't Right" is stylized as "IF iT Ain’T rIGHt"
 "Ferris Wheel" is stylized as "FeRRis WhEEL"
 "Cut Me Off" is stylized as "CuT me oFF"
 "The Run Off" is stylized as "ThE RUn oFF"
 "You Thought Wrong" is stylized as "YoU ThouGHt WrONg"
 "Miami" is stylized as "MiAMi"
 "Keep in Touch" is stylized as "KeeP IN tOUcH"
 "S.W.I.N.G" is stylized as "S.w.I.n.G"
 "KJM" is stylized as "KJm" and is an abbreviation for "Kendall Jenner Music"
 "Broke Leg" contains uncredited vocals by O.T. Genasis
 "Freaky" contains uncredited vocals by Rich the Kid

Sample credits
 "Broke Leg" contains a sample from "Back That Thang Up", written by Terius Gray, Dwayne Carter, and Byron Thomas, as performed by Juvenile featuring Mannie Fresh and Lil Wayne.

Personnel
Credits adapted from Tidal.
Charles Dumazer – associated performer , programming 
Johann Chavez – studio personnel , mixer , engineer 
Play Picasso – studio personnel , mixer 
Alex Petit – associated performer , programming 
Samuel Jimenez – associated performer , programming 
Finis "KY" White – studio personnel , mixer 
MikFly – engineer , studio personnel 
Daystar Peterson – engineer , studio personnel 
Alex Petit – associated performer , programming 
Michael Hernandez – associated performer , programming 
Dylan Cleary-Krel – associated performer , programming 
Oz – associated performer 
Dez Wright – associated performer 
Stonii Tha Melody God – associated performer , programming 
Rockamore – associated performer , programming 
Bobby Keyz – associated performer , programming 
Kevin Orellana – associated performer , programming 
Joshua Cross – associated performer , programming 
Bryson Tiller – engineer , studio personnel 
Chris Gehringer – mastering engineer , studio personnel

Charts

Weekly charts

Year-end charts

Certifications

References

2018 albums
Albums produced by C-Sick
Tory Lanez albums
Interscope Records albums
Juno Award for Rap Recording of the Year recordings